Gulab-e Vosta (also Romanized as Gūlāb-e Vosţá and Gūlāb-e Vosṭī; also known as Gūlāb-e Vasaţ, Gulāb-e Bālā, Gūlāb-e Mīān, and Gūlāb-e ‘Olyā) is a village in Beyranvand-e Jonubi Rural District, Bayravand District, Khorramabad County, Lorestan Province, Iran. At the 2006 census, its population was 62, in 13 families.

References 

Towns and villages in Khorramabad County